U.S. Highway 178 (US 178) is a spur of U.S. Highway 78. It passes through the states of South Carolina and North Carolina. It goes through the cities of Pickens, Anderson, North, Orangeburg, Harleyville, South Carolina and Bowman, South Carolina.

Route description
The U.S. Highway is a part of the National Highway System from I-85 near Anderson to US 378 in Saluda.

US 178 begins at an intersection with US 64 just west of the town of Rosman within Pisgah National Forest in southern Transylvania County, North Carolina. The two-lane road, which is named Pickens Highway, heads east into the town parallel to the French Broad River. US 178 turns south onto Chestnut Street, crosses the river to leave the town, and turns east again to parallel the river. The highway veers away from the mainstem of the French Broad to follow its Middle Fork south then east, then turns south and climbs to the Eastern Continental Divide at Eastatoe Gap between Burnt Mountain and Indian Camp Mountain. US 178 enters Pickens County, South Carolina, and its name changes to Moorefield Memorial Highway shortly after it begins its curvaceous and steep descent along Eastatoe Creek to Rocky Bottom. There, the U.S. Highway meets the western end of F. Van Clayton Memorial Highway, which leads to the highest point in South Carolina, Sassafras Mountain.

US 178 crosses another ridge into the valley of Reedy Cove Creek, then climbs again to Beasley Gap between Rich Mountain and Horse Mountain. From there, the highway has a sharp and curvy descent to the valley of the Oolenoy River, which it follows east to near its junction with SC 11 (Cherokee Foothills Scenic Highway) at the hamlet of Holly Springs. US 178 curves south at its intersection with SC 288 (Table Rock Road), has a short climb to Mosley Gap between Mosley Mountain and Walnut Cove Mountain, and follows several different creeks through the foothills, which the highway exits as it enters the town of Pickens. The highway expands to four lanes and enters the town on Ann Street and has a very brief concurrency with SC 183 (Main Street) in the center of town; SC 183 connects US 178 with SC 8. US 178 leaves the town along Pendleton Street and drops to two lanes again south of town. The highway passes Pickens County Airport on its way to Liberty. The U.S. Highway, which enters the town along Pickens Drive, intersects SC 93 (Main Street) in the center of the town and has a grade crossing of Norfolk Southern Railway's Greenville District as it leaves town along Anderson Drive. Just south of the town limits, US 178 has a diamond interchange with US 123 (Calhoun Memorial Highway).

US 178 meets the southern end of SC 135 shortly before entering Anderson County, where the highway becomes Liberty Highway and intersects SC 88 (Old Greenville Highway). The highway crosses the Six and Twenty Creek arm of Lake Hartwell and temporarily expands to four lanes around its intersection with US 176 Connector, which feeds into SC 28's western bypass of Anderson, Pearman Dairy Road. US 178 gradually approaches US 76 and SC 28 Business (Clemson Boulevard) as it enters a commercial area before meeting and joining those highways at an oblique intersection. The three highways follow an undivided highway with three southbound lanes, two northbound lanes, and a center turn lane into the city of Anderson, where the road's name changes to Main Street and passes to the east of the Civic Center of Anderson. South of Anderson Mall, SC 28 Business continues on Main Street while US 178 and US 76 veer onto four-lane North Avenue, which parallels Main Street on the west. Shortly after North Avenue splits into one-way carriageways split by a wide parked median, the avenue veers east toward Main Street and the U.S. Highways continue along Club Drive and Park Drive, which have several sports field in their wide median.

US 178 and US 76 enter downtown Anderson along four-lane Murray Avenue, which runs one block to the west of Main Street.

US 178 is signed north–south in North Carolina and east–west in South Carolina; which is why it is listed as having a northern and eastern terminus.

Future
NCDOT plans to modernize a  section of US 178, between Rosman and the South Carolina state line. At an estimated cost of $14.1 million, it is currently unfunded.

Junction list

Special routes

Northlake connector

U.S. Route 178 Connector (US 178 Conn.) is a  connector route of US 178 entirely within the southern part of Northlake. It connects US 76, South Carolina Highway 28 (SC 28), and SC 28 Business (SC 28 Bus.) with US 178 (Liberty Highway). It is an unsigned highway.

Greenwood business loop

U.S. Route 178 Business (US 178 Bus.) is a  business route of US 178 in Greenwood. Nearly the entire path is within the city limits of Greenwood. It is completely concurrent with US 25 Bus.

Saluda connector

U.S. Route 178 Connector (US 178 Conn.) is a  connector route of US 178 that is entirely within the city limits of Saluda. It serves to connect US 178, South Carolina Highway 39 (SC 39), and SC 121 with US 378 and SC 194. It is known as Travis Avenue and is an unsigned highway.

Orangeburg business loop

U.S. Route 178 Business (US 178 Bus.) is a  business route of US 178 in the western part of the city of Orangeburg.

See also

 List of United States Numbered Highways

References

External links

 The Highways of South Carolina: US 178
 Endpoints of U.S. Highway 178

78-1
78-1
78-1
Transportation in Transylvania County, North Carolina
Transportation in Pickens County, South Carolina
Transportation in Anderson County, South Carolina
Transportation in Abbeville County, South Carolina
Transportation in Greenwood County, South Carolina
Transportation in Saluda County, South Carolina
Transportation in Lexington County, South Carolina
Transportation in Orangeburg County, South Carolina
Transportation in Dorchester County, South Carolina
1